Jason Wilnis (born 10 December 1990) is a Dutch professional mixed martial artist and former kickboxer of Surinamese descent competing in the Middleweight division. He is the last It's Showtime 85MAX champion and former Glory Middleweight Champion. Notably, he holds wins in kickboxing against mixed martial artists and future UFC Middleweight champions Israel Adesanya and Alex Pereira.

He was ranked in the middleweight top ten by Combat Press between September 2014 and July 2021, peaking at #1 between October 2016 and May 2017.

Biography and career

Early career and It's Showtime title win
He was keen football player until he followed his older brother, Jahfarr Wilnis to The Colosseum Gym in Utrecht, Netherlands to train kickboxing at the age of 17. He had his first fight not long after he started training.

When Sahak Parparyan vacated his It's Showtime title, Jason jumped in and challenged Alex Pereira on 10 November 2012 for the It's Showtime 85MAX championship in São Paulo Brazil at It's Showtime 60 event, becoming last It's Showtime champion by 2nd-round TKO. He dropped Pereira three times in round with low kicks.

On 28 September 2013 he participated in Glory 10: Los Angeles - Middleweight World Championship Tournament, losing in the semi finals to Artem Levin by judges unanimous decision.

He fought Sahak Parparyan in the semi-finals of the Glory 14: Zagreb - Middleweight Contender Tournament in Zagreb, Croatia on March 8, 2014, losing by split decision after three even rounds.

Glory Middleweight Contender tournament
He was expected to face Miroslav Cingel at FFC11: Sanchez vs. Bekavac on April 4, 2014, but replaced with Sahak Parparyan because of back injury. He next fought Tomáš Šenkýr at Gibu Fight Night, winning the fight by unanimous decision. Returning to Glory, Wilnis was scheduled to fight the #2 ranked Wayne Barrett at Glory 18. Wilnis won the fight by unanimous decision. He next took part in the 2015 Glory Middleweight Contender tournament, held during the Glory 20: Dubai event. He won the semifinal bout against Alex Pereira by unanimous decision, but lost the final against Simon Marcus by split decision. 

Moving briefly away from Glory, he fought David Keclik at FFC 19 - Linz. He won the fight by TKO, after Keclik retired at the end of the second round.

Glory Middleweight title reign
In his next fight, Wilnis fought Joe Schilling in a GLORY Middleweight title eliminator, coming into the fight as heavy underdog. Schilling won the fight by TKO due to injury, as Wilnis was forced to withdraw due to a broken toe. He rebounded from this loss with a majority decision win against Wang Chongyang at Kunlun Fight 37. He then fought Filip Verlinden at Glory 28: Paris, and won by unanimous decision. At Glory 30: Los Angeles, he fought a rematch with Joe Schilling, whom he beat by majority decision.

This three fight winning streak earned Winis the chance to challenge Simon Marcus for the Glory Middleweight championship at Glory 33. Despite a slow start to the fight, Wilnis began to take over as the fight went on and won the fight by TKO in the third round, managing to knock Marcus down three times in the third round.

For his first title defense, Wilnis was scheduled to fight Israel Adesanya at Glory 37. Wilnis won the fight by unanimous decision (49-46, 48-47, 48-47), although the fight results were considered controversial by many media members.

For his second title defense, Wilnis was scheduled to fight a trilogy match with Simon Marcus at Glory 40: Copenhagen. He lost the fight by split decision.

Post title reign
Wilnis' losing streak extended, as he lost the next two fights as well, losing by TKO to Yousri Belgaroui and losing by split decision to Simon Marcus. He arrested the losing streak with a third round TKO of Jacob Rodriguez at Glory 63.

He then fought Alex Pereira at Glory 65 for the Glory Middleweight Championship. He lost the fight a flying knee knockout, which was later named by Combat Press as the 2019 "Knockout of the Year".

Wilnis then fought Donovan Wisse at Glory 70: Lyon. He lost the fight by unanimous decision. His losing streak extended to three, as he lost to Vladimir Idranyi by unanimous decision.

Mixed martial arts career
In July 2021, Wilnis made the move to mixed martial arts after signing a deal with Netherlands-based Levels Fight League. He was scheduled to face Erhan Okuroglu at Levels Fight League 2 on July 26, 2021. Wilnis won his debut fight by a first-round technical knockout.

Wilnis faced David Casal Moldes at Levels Fight League 4 on March 13, 2022. Wilnis won the bout via unanimous decision.

Wilnis signed with KSW, making his debut on May 28, 2022 at KSW 70 against Radosław Paczuski.  He lost the bout in the third round after breaking his finger.

Wilnis was booked to face Ahmed Sami at Levels Fight League 6 on October 2, 2022. He lost the bout via unanimous decision.

Titles
Glory
2016 Glory Middleweight (-85 kg/187.4 lb) Championship (one time)

It's Showtime
2012 It's Showtime 85MAX World Champion -85 kg

Mixed martial arts record 

 

|-
|Loss
|align=center|2–2
|Ahmed Sami
|Decision (unanimous)
|Levels Fight League 6
|
|align=center|3
|align=center|5:00
|Amsterdam, Netherlands
|
|-
|Loss
|align=center|2–1
|Radosław Paczuski
|TKO (finger injury)
|KSW 70: Pudzianowski vs. Materla
|
|align=center|3
|align=center|1:46
|Łódź, Poland
|
|-
|Win
|align=center|2–0
|David Casal Moldes
|Decision (unanimous)
|Levels Fight League 4
|
|align=center|3
|align=center|5:00
|Amsterdam,  Netherlands
|
|-
|Win
|align=center|1–0
|Erhan Okuroglu
|TKO (punches)
|Levels Fight League 2 
|
|align=center|1
|align=center|4:08
|Amsterdam, Netherlands
|
|-

Kickboxing record

|-  bgcolor="#FFBBBB"
| 2020-08-27 || Loss ||align=left| Vladimir Idranyi || Yangames Fight Night 8 || Prague, Czech Republic || Decision (Unanimous) || 3|| 3:00
|-  bgcolor="#FFBBBB"
| 2019-10-26 || Loss ||align=left| Donovan Wisse || Glory 70: Lyon || Lyon, France || Decision (Unanimous) || 3|| 3:00
|-  bgcolor="#FFBBBB"
| 2019-05-17 || Loss ||align=left| Alex Pereira || Glory 65: Utrecht || Utrecht, Netherlands || KO (Flying Knee) || 1 || 1:31
|-
! style=background:white colspan=9 |
|-
|-  bgcolor="#CCFFCC"
| 2019-02-01 || Win ||align=left| Jacob Rodriguez || Glory 63: Houston || Houston, US || TKO (Leg Injury) || 3 || 0:15 
|-
|-  bgcolor="#FFBBBB"
| 2018-08-10 || Loss ||align=left|   Simon Marcus || Glory 56: Denver || Broomfield, Colorado, US || Decision (Split) || 3 || 3:00
|-
|-  bgcolor="#FFBBBB"
| 2017-09-30 || Loss ||align=left|   Yousri Belgaroui || Glory 45: Amsterdam || Amsterdam, Netherlands || Doctor Stoppage (Cut) || 1 || 2:47
|- 
|-  bgcolor="#FFBBBB"
| 2017-04-29 || Loss ||align=left| Simon Marcus || Glory 40: Copenhagen || Copenhagen, Denmark || Decision (split) || 5 || 3:00
|- 
! style=background:white colspan=9 |
|-
|-  bgcolor="#CCFFCC"
| 2017-01-20 || Win ||align=left| Israel Adesanya|| Glory 37: Los Angeles || Los Angeles, California, US || Decision (unanimous) || 5 || 3:00 
|- 
! style=background:white colspan=9 |
|-
|-  bgcolor="#CCFFCC"
| 2016-09-09 || Win ||align=left| Simon Marcus || Glory 33: New Jersey || Trenton, New Jersey, US || TKO (referee stoppage) || 3 || 1:14 
|- 
! style=background:white colspan=9 |
|-
|-  bgcolor="#CCFFCC"
| 2016-05-13 || Win ||align=left| Joe Schilling || Glory 30: Los Angeles || Ontario, California || Decision (majority) || 3 || 3:00
|-
|-  bgcolor="#CCFFCC"
| 2016-03-12 || Win ||align=left| Filip Verlinden || Glory 28: Paris || Paris, France || Decision (unanimous) || 3 || 3:00
|-
|-  bgcolor= "#CCFFCC"
| 2016-01-23 || Win ||align=left| Wang Chongyang  || Kunlun Fight 37 || Sanya, China || Decision (majority) || 3 || 3:00
|-
|-  bgcolor="#FFBBBB"
| 2015-10-09 || Loss ||align=left| Joe Schilling || Glory 24: Denver || Denver, Colorado, US || TKO (injury) || 2 || 3:00
|- 
! style=background:white colspan=9 |
|-
|-  bgcolor= "#CCFFCC"
| 2015-09-18 || Win||align=left| David Keclik  || FFC 19 - Linz || Linz, Austria || TKO (retirement) || 2 || 3:00
|-
|-  bgcolor="#FFBBBB"
| 2015-04-03 || Loss ||align=left| Simon Marcus || Glory 20: Dubai, Final || Dubai, UAE || Decision (split) || 3 || 3:00
|-
! style=background:white colspan=9 |
|-
|-  bgcolor="#CCFFCC"
| 2015-04-03 || Win ||align=left| Alex Pereira || Glory 20: Dubai, Semi Finals || Dubai, UAE || Decision (unanimous) || 3 || 3:00
|-
|-  bgcolor="#CCFFCC"
| 2014-11-07 ||Win||align=left| Wayne Barrett || Glory 18: Oklahoma || Oklahoma City, Oklahoma, US || Decision (unanimous) || 3 || 3:00
|-
|-  bgcolor="#CCFFCC"
| 2014-06-12 ||Win||align=left|  Tomáš Šenkýr ||Gibu Fight Night || Praha, Czech Republic || Decision (unanimous) || 3 || 3:00 
|-
|-  bgcolor="#FFBBBB"
| 2014-03-08 ||Loss ||align=left|  Sahak Parparyan || Glory 14: Zagreb, Semi Finals || Zagreb, Croatia ||Decision (split) ||3 ||3:00
|-
|-  bgcolor="#FFBBBB"
| 2013-09-28 || Loss || align=left| Artem Levin || Glory 10: Los Angeles, Semi Finals || Ontario, California, US || Decision (unanimous) || 3 || 3:00 
|-
|-  bgcolor= "#CCFFCC"
| 2013-05-10 || Win||align=left| Zoran Majkić || FFC04: Perak vs. Joni || Zadar, Croatia || KO || 1 ||2:59 
|-
|-  bgcolor="#CCFFCC"
| 2013-03-15 || Win||align=left| Toni Milanović || K-1 World Grand Prix 2012 Final, Super Fight || Zagreb, Croatia ||TKO ||1 || 
|-
|-  bgcolor="#CCFFCC"
| 2012-12-31 || Win ||align=left| Toshio Matsumoto || Glory 4: Tokyo || Saitama, Japan || Decision (unanimous) || 3 || 3:00 
|-
|-  bgcolor="#CCFFCC"
| 2012-11-10 || Win||align=left| Alex Pereira || It's Showtime 60 || São Paulo, Brazil ||TKO (3 knockdowns)||2 || 
|-
! style=background:white colspan=9 |
|-
|-  bgcolor="#FFBBBB"
| 2012-09-15 || Loss ||align=left| Sahak Parparyan || Iron Ring || Alkmaar, Netherlands || Decision || 3 || 3:00
|-
|-  bgcolor="#CCFFCC"
| 2012-09-02 || Win ||align=left| Luis Tavares || Muay Thai Mania V || The Hague, Netherlands || Decision|| 3 || 3:00
|-  bgcolor="#FFBBBB"
| 2012-05-12 || Loss||align=left| Cheick Sidibé || Siam Gym Belgium presents: It's Showtime 56 || Kortrijk, Belgium ||Decision (unanimous)||3 || 3:00
|-
|-  bgcolor="#CCFFCC"
| 2011-11-12 || Win ||align=left| Francis Javier Jorge ||  It's Showtime 53 || Tenerife, Spain || Decision || 3 || 3:00
|-
|-  bgcolor="#CCFFCC"
| 2010-12-18 || Win ||align=left| Geronimo de Groot || Fightclub presents: It's Showtime 2010 || Amsterdam, Netherlands || KO || 1 || 
|-
|-  bgcolor="CCFFCC"
| 2010-08-29 || Win ||align=left| Brandon Richardson || Slamm Fighting with the Stars || Paramaribo, Suriname || TKO (punches) || 1|| 
|-
|-  bgcolor="#c5d2ea"
| 2010-05-02 || Draw ||align=left| Nale Omeragić || Next Generation Warriors 4, B-Class || Utrecht, Netherlands || Decision || 3 || 3:00
|-
|-  bgcolor="CCFFCC"
| 2010-03-21 || Win ||align=left| Joey Kaptijn || K-1 World MAX 2010 West Europe Tournament || Utrecht, Netherlands || Decision (unanimous) || 3 || 3:00
|-
|-  bgcolor="#CCFFCC"
| 2009-05-31 || Win ||align=left| Youssef Yacoubi || Next Generation Warriors 3, C-Class, -79 kg || Utrecht, Netherlands || Decision || 3 || 2:00
|-
|-  bgcolor="#CCFFCC"
| 2009-03-01 || Win ||align=left| Edgar Sadoiev || K-1 World MAX 2009 Europe Tournament, C-Class || Utrecht, Netherlands || Decision (Unanimous) || 3 || 2:00
|-
|-
| colspan=9 | Legend:

See also 
List of It's Showtime events
List of It's Showtime champions
List of male kickboxers

References

External links
Profile at Glory

1990 births
Living people
Sportspeople from Utrecht (city)
Dutch male kickboxers
Dutch male mixed martial artists
Mixed martial artists utilizing kickboxing
Mixed martial artists utilizing Muay Thai
Middleweight kickboxers
Dutch Muay Thai practitioners
Dutch sportspeople of Surinamese descent
Glory kickboxers
Kunlun Fight kickboxers